The 2008 Food City 500 was the fifth race of the 2008 NASCAR Sprint Cup Series, and it was held on Sunday, March 16, 2008 at Bristol Motor Speedway in Bristol, Tennessee. This race aired on Fox starting at 1:30 PM US EDT with radio coverage handled by Performance Racing Network and Sirius Satellite Radio with programming starting at 1 PM US EDT. The race marked the last race utilizing the 2007 Top 35 owners points exemption. Starting with the Goody's Cool Orange 500 on March 30 each week's Top 35 teams will be exempt.

The race marked the 676th and final career points start for Dale Jarrett, who made one final start in the Sprint All-Star Race XXIV. Dale's father, Ned, himself a former series champion and television commentator, waved the green flag for his son's final race. Starting on March 30 David Reutimann became the new driver of the #44 car, while Michael McDowell made his debut in the #00 car.

Qualifying
Qualifying was canceled due to rain on March 14 so the field was set by the rulebook for the second (and final) time this year using the 2007 Owners' points. As a result, Jimmie Johnson was on the pole.

Race
Jarrett started deep in the field and fell one lap down to the leader just before the first competition caution on lap 50. That caution was brought out because the track surface had been washed clean by a rain the previous night. He finished 37th.

Drivers that spun out include Kyle Busch (while in the lead) and Robby Gordon. The only car in the 43 car field that wasn't running at the end was driven by Brian Vickers.

With two laps left, Kevin Harvick bobbled entering a turn and pushed up into second place Tony Stewart. Stewart hit the wall, bringing out a caution, and finished as the last car on the lead lap in 14th. Denny Hamlin was leading at the time but he suddenly slowed after he had fuel pickup problems and quickly faded to finish eighth. The race went six laps past its scheduled length due to the green-white-checker finish rule, and was won by Jeff Burton. Richard Childress Racing finished 1-2-3 for the first time in team history, with Harvick finishing second and Clint Bowyer third.

Results 

Failed to make race due to cancellation of qualifying: Patrick Carpentier (#10), Jeff Green (#21), John Andretti (#34).

References

 

Food City 500
Food City 500
NASCAR races at Bristol Motor Speedway
Food City 500